The 2005 VMI Keydets football team represented the Virginia Military Institute during the 2005 NCAA Division I FCS football season. It was the Keydets' 115th year of football, and their 3rd season in the Big South Conference.

After opening the year with a shutout win over Davidson, VMI lost its next three games to William & Mary, FBS-Duke, and Lehigh. They rebounded by winning two straight conference games over Charleston Southern, 34–12, and Liberty, 10–7, but ending the year on a five-game losing streak to end the season at 3–8 and 2–2 in Big South play, including a 22–14 loss to The Citadel in the Military Classic of the South.

Schedule

Source: 2005 VMI Football Schedule

References

VMI
VMI Keydets football seasons
VMI Keydets football